Journey Into The Morn is a progressive rock album by Iona. Released in 1996. It was their first studio album since Beyond These Shores in 1993.

Recordings were based in the north of England again The Soundfield, Derbyshire with audio engineer Neil Costello, with some additional recording at Perfect Sounds, Thornton, Nr. Bradford.

Personnel

Band
 Joanne Hogg - vocals, guitar
 Dave Bainbridge - guitars, keyboards, e-bow guitar, mandolin, mandola
 Tim Harries - bass, vocals
 Terl Bryant - drums, percussion
 Troy Donockley - uilleann pipes, low whistles, tin whistle, vocals, whitby shell chimes
 Mike Haughton - saxophone, flute, tin whistle, vocals

Additional musicians and special guests
 Máire Brennan - Celtic harp, vocals
 Robert Fripp - guitar synth, Frippertronics on "Divine Presence" and "The Search"
 Peter Whitfield - violins, viola
 Chris Eaton - additional backing vocals

Track listing
Disc - Total Time 78:14
"Bi-Se I Mo Shúil" Part 1  – 2:06
"Irish Day"  – 5:14
"Wisdom"  – 4:58
"Everything Changes"  – 5:34
"Inside My Heart"  – 6:09
"Encircling"  – 11:41
"Journey Into the Morn"  – 2:58
"Lindisfarne"  – 6:30
"No Heart Beats"  – 4:49
"The Search"  – 2:42
"Divine Presence"  – 5:29
"Heaven's Bright Sun"  – 7:26
"Bi-Se I Mo Shuil" Part 2  – 4:33
"When I Survey"  – 8:05

Release details
1996, UK, Alliance Records ALD 050, Release Date 20 February 1996, CD
1996, UK, Alliance Records ALC 050, Release Date 20 February 1996, Cassette
1996, U.S., Forefront Records FFD-5142, Release Date 20 February 1996, CD
1996, U.S., Forefront Records FFC-5142, Release Date 20 February 1996, Cassette
2005, UK, Open Sky Records OPENVP9CD, Release Date 5 November 2005, CD

References

Iona (band) albums
1996 albums